Yelü Chucai ("Longbeard", written in Chinese characters as "", July 24, 1190 – June 20, 1244), courtesy name Jinqing, was a Khitan statesman from the imperial clan of the Liao dynasty, who became a vigorous adviser and administrator of the early Mongol Empire in the Confucian tradition. He was the first of Genghis Khan's retainers to formulate policy during the Mongol invasions and conquests, and he also introduced many administrative reforms in North China during the reign of Genghis Khan and his successor Ögedei.

Biography
Yelü Chucai was a Confucian scholar who was born close to Beijing, during the Jin dynasty. Well versed in Buddhist scriptures and a practitioner in Taoism, Yelü Chucai has become best known for his service as the chief adviser to Genghis Khan. Yelü Chucai's father Yelü Lu, served with the Jurchen-led Jin dynasty, which defeated the Liao dynasty in 1125. When the unified Mongol army under Genghis Khan began a war of conquest against the Jin dynasty in 1211, both Jurchen and Khitan rebels joined the Mongols in the fight against the Jin dynasty. Yelü Chucai then joined Genghis Khan's administration in the year 1218 at the age of 28.

The Khitans and Mongols, as well as the Southern Song, were united by their common enemy in the Jin dynasty. This is shown in the well-known words spoken by Genghis Khan, when at the end of July, he met Yelü Chucai for the first time at Ordos in the Sāri Steppe (west of the great bend of the Kerulen River): "Liao and Jin have been enemies for generations; I have taken revenge for you."  To which Yelü Chucai replied, "My father and grandfather have both respectfully served the Jin.  How can I, as a subject and a son, be so insincere in heart as to consider my sovereign and my father as enemies?" The Mongol is said to have been impressed by this frank reply, as well as by Yelü Chucai's looks (he was a very tall man with a magnificent beard reaching to his waist) and sonorous voice.  He gave him the nickname "Urtu Saqal" (Long Beard) and placed him in his retinue as an adviser. Because he was experienced in writing and knew the laws of other settled societies, Yelü Chucai was useful to the Empire.

He did his best to convince the Mongols to tax rather than slaughter conquered peoples.  In Grousset's Empire of the Steppes, it is reported that Ögedei would mock him, asking "Are you going to weep for the people again?". The wise chancellor had the great words to temper the barbaric leanings of Mongol practices, stating to Genghis Khan's son and successor to the throne, that while empires may be conquered on horseback, they could not be ruled on horseback. Yelü Chucai used his office to save other fellow Confucian scholars from punishment and mistreatment by Mongol rulers. He also helped them gain offices as bureaucrats and tutors to the Mongol princes.

While Northern China was capitulating to the Mongol onslaught, Yelü Chucai instituted several administrative reforms, like separating civil and military powers and introducing numerous taxes and levies.  In response to the tough resistance the Mongol army faced while trying to conquer the Jurchen Jin's southern capital of Kaifeng, some Mongol officers in high command recommended the complete razing of Kaifeng and the deaths of all its occupants.  But Yelü Chucai convinced Genghis Khan to rule and tax the people, and make use of their extraordinary talents instead of killing all of them in order to further their own riches.  He was six-foot eight-inches tall and had a waist-length beard. He was buried by Kunming Lake in Beijing, and a temple constructed in his memory stood until 1966, when it was razed during the looting of the Summer Palace by communist Red Guards as part of the Cultural Revolution. Yelü Chucai was the last recorded person to be able to speak the Khitan language and read and write the Khitan large and small scripts.

See also
Temple of Azure Clouds

References

External links
Biography on Bookrags.com
Biography on ColdSiberia.org
Translation of Yelu Chucai's description of Central Asia, based on travels with Chinggis Khan's army
Translation of Yelu Chucai's official Yuanshi biography

1190 births
1244 deaths
Politicians from Beijing
12th-century Khitan people
Yuan dynasty politicians
Last known speakers of a language
Yelü clan
13th-century Khitan people